Michael Barson (born 21 April 1958) is a Scottish-born multi-instrumentalist, songwriter, and composer. In a career spanning more than 40 years, Barson came to prominence in the late 1970s as the keyboard player for the band Madness.

Early years 
Barson was born in Edinburgh, Scotland. He grew up in North London with his two brothers, Dan and Ben, who are also musicians (with Ben being one of Roland Gift's collaborators). He is often known by the nicknames "Monsieur Barso" or "Barzo".

Prior to forming Madness, Barson and fellow future Madness member Lee Thompson gained some notice as graffiti artists in the mid-1970s. After reading about the emerging New York graffiti scene, they spray-painted their nicknames ("Mr B" and "Kix") along with two friends' names "Cat" and "Columbo" around north London. They managed to spray their nicknames on George Melly's garage door, prompting Melly to write a newspaper article declaring: "If I ever catch that Mr B, Kix and Columbo, I'm going to kick their arses".

Barson co-founded a band called The Invaders in 1976. The band later changed their name to Madness after the song by Prince Buster.

Music career 

Madness became a successful British band during the late 1970s to mid-1980s, having initial success as part of the Two-Tone movement. Barson was and is a prominent songwriter in the band, and effectively the musical director. He left in 1984 after the recording of their fifth studio album Keep Moving and appearing in the promotional music videos for the two singles from that album – "Michael Caine", and "One Better Day". Two years later, Madness disbanded, but Barson did join them for the recording of their final single, "(Waiting For) The Ghost Train."

Madness reunited in their original line-up in 1992, and Barson still plays with them. In 1995, he co-wrote and produced a number of songs for Suggs' first solo album The Lone Ranger. When No Doubt were recording songs for their fifth studio album Rock Steady, Barson was asked to play piano on the London version of the song "Everything in Time". Barson obliged and the track was produced by Madness producers Clive Langer and Alan Winstanley. The track was not included on the album, but was released a year later in 2003 on the compilation album Everything in Time (B-sides, Rarities, Remixes).

Both Barson and his bandmate, Suggs, have contributed to Audio Bullys' album Higher Than the Eiffel. They both appear on the tracks "Twist Me Up" and "Goodbye".

Political views 
In September 2016, Barson told the website The Canary that he was a member of the left-wing campaigning group Momentum and voted for Jeremy Corbyn in the Labour Party leadership election. He said: "I heard all these unpleasant people on the news saying how terrible Momentum was so I thought I'd give it a go! I also heard how Jeremy could never win an election so I thought I'd have to vote for him too..."

References

External links 
Mike Barson's official MySpace
Madness official MadSpace

1958 births
Living people
British keyboardists
British ska musicians
Madness (band) members
Musicians from Edinburgh
Labour Party (UK) people